Borsunlu (also, Borsunlu Pervoye and Borsunly) is a village and municipality in the Tartar Rayon of Azerbaijan.  It has a population of 1,093.  The municipality consists of the villages of Borsunlu and Qırmızı-Saqqallar.

References 

Populated places in Tartar District